York Chow Yat-ngok (born 1947, Hong Kong), GBS, SBS, MBE, was the Secretary for Food and Health of Hong Kong and a member of the Executive Council. He was appointed as Secretary for Health, Welfare and Food in 2004. The position has since been renamed to Secretary for Food and Health from reshuffling in 2007.

History
Chow is an orthopaedic surgeon by profession. He was appointed Hospital Chief Executive of Queen Mary Hospital in 2001. Chow was appointed a Vice-President of the International Paralympic Committee in 1997.

During his studies in the University of Hong Kong since 1967, he stayed in St. John's College and has served as the male sports captain in the academic years 1968–1969.

Controversies

2011 June protest
On 25 June 2011, a small protest was held by about ten mothers begging on the street for the attention of Chow regarding the mainland Chinese mothers birth tourism issues with hospital capacities. These are families that have a mainland mother and a Hong Kong father. Chow did sympathise with these couples, but nothing was done after the protest. The issue later expanded to the Early 2012 Hong Kong protests which was also triggered by Kong Qingdong's comment.

References

1947 births
Alumni of the University of Hong Kong
Alumni of St. John's College, University of Hong Kong
Government officials of Hong Kong
Hong Kong civil servants
Hong Kong medical doctors
Living people
Members of the Order of the British Empire
Recipients of the Silver Bauhinia Star
Recipients of the Gold Bauhinia Star